The Allentown Red Sox (A-Sox) were a minor league baseball team, affiliated with the Boston Red Sox and based in Allentown, Pennsylvania, that played from 1958 through 1960 in the Eastern League. At that time, the Eastern League was officially Class A, but, prior to the minor-league classification realignment that took place in 1963, that level was almost equivalent to Double-A.

History

From 1939 through 1952, Allentown had hosted a Class B Interstate League franchise, the Cardinals—also the Dukes, FleetWings and Wings—and for much of that period, it was an affiliate of the namesake St. Louis Cardinals. When the Interstate loop folded, the Cardinals returned to Allentown in 1954 as a member of the Eastern League for three seasons, through 1956.

The Allentown Red Sox franchise dates to 1933 as the Reading Phillies. It became a farm team for the Red Sox in 1938 as the Hazelton (PA) Red Sox. In 1957, the Red Sox purchased the former Detroit Tigers Eastern League team, the Syracuse Chiefs, and moved the club to Allentown mid-season, being operated as an unaffiliated team for the balance of the season.  The Red Sox ended their affiliation with their Eastern League team in Albany, New York after the season and reassigned it to Allentown for the 1958 season.

Owned by Joe Buzas, the team played for three seasons at Max Hess Stadium (formerly Breadon Field), owned by Max Hess, Jr., owner of the Allentown Hess Brothers department store. Former Allentown player Tracy Stallard is remembered as the pitcher who served up Roger Maris' 61st home run in 1961 while playing for Boston. Another player who appeared at the stadium was Curt Simmons, a native of Egypt, Pennsylvania, who pitched at Max Hess Stadium in a rehab assignment for the Asheville (NC) Tourists, a farm team of the Philadelphia Phillies. The presence of Curt Simmons filled up the stands. For the 1960 season, Bob Heffner, who graduated from Allentown High School as a two-sport letterman in 1957 played for the A-Sox. He had the best pitching record on the club at 16-9. Heffner later played in the majors for the Red Sox, Cleveland Indians and California Angels in 1968.

The A-Sox's best season was 1960.  On September 3, 1960, the Red Sox kept its Eastern League playoff hopes alive with a 7-6, 3-2 sweep of Williamsport at Hess Stadium, the second of four straight doubleheaders the A-Sox played to close out the season. Two days later, Allentown's playoff bid ended in a 5-4, 11-inning defeat at Springfield in the first game of a Labor Day doubleheader. The holiday crowd of 1,297 at Hess Stadium witnessed the last professional baseball game in Allentown for 37 years.

Legacy
After the 1960 season, the team was relocated due to a lack of attendance (average of 650 fans per game in 1960), the team moved to Johnstown, Pennsylvania on December 5, 1960, for the 1961 season played as the Johnstown Red Sox at Point Stadium.
Over subsequent seasons, the club has remained in the Eastern League under different names in various cities:
 1962             York White Roses, York, Pennsylvania (Class A)
 1963–1964   Reading Red Sox, Reading, Pennsylvania (Double-A hereafter)
 1965–1969   Pittsfield Red Sox, Pittsfield, Massachusetts
 1970–1972   Pawtucket Red Sox, Pawtucket, Rhode Island
 1973–1982   Bristol Red Sox, Bristol, Connecticut
 1983–1994   New Britain Red Sox, New Britain, Connecticut
 1995–2015   Hardware City/New Britain Rock Cats, New Britain, Connecticut (affiliated with Minnesota Twins, then Colorado Rockies)
 2016–           Hartford Yard Goats, Hartford, Connecticut (Colorado Rockies)

The Red Sox parted company with the franchise in 1995, signing a player development contract with the Trenton Thunder. Since 2003, the Portland Sea Dogs have been Boston's affiliate in the Eastern League.

Seasons
 1958 Season
 Won: 51  Lost: 83  Pct: .381   4th Place Eastern Division, 24 GB
 Manager: Eddie Popowski

1958 Complete Team Statistics

 1959 Season
 Won: 82  Lost: 59  Pct: .582  2nd Place, 3 GB
 Manager: Sheriff Robinson
 Attendance: 84,000

1959 Complete Team Statistics

 1960 Season
 Won: 67  Lost: 72  Pct: .482  5th Place, 9 GB
 Manager: Sheriff Robinson
 Attendance: 51,654

1960 Complete Team Statistics

Major league players

 Joe Albanese, 1958
 Washington Senators, AL, 1958
 Al Cihocki, 1958
 Cleveland Indians, AL, 1945
 Galen Cisco, 1959
 Boston Red Sox, AL, 1961, 1967
 New York Mets, NL, 1963-1964
 Kansas City Royals, AL, 1969
 Marlan Coughtry, 1959, 1960
 Boston Red Sox, AL, 1960
 Los Angeles Angels, AL, 1962
 Kansas City Athletics, AL, 1962
 Cleveland Indians, AL, 1962
 Arnold Earley, 1959
 Boston Red Sox, AL, 1960-1965
 Chicago Cubs, NL, 1966
 Houston Astros, NL, 1967
 Don Gile, 1958, 1959
 Boston Red Sox, AL, 1959-1962
 Guido Grilli, 1960
 Boston Red Sox, AL, 1966
 Kansas City Athletics, AL, 1966
 Bob Heffner, 1959, 1960
 Boston Red Sox, AL, 1963-1965
 Cleveland Indians, AL, 1966
 Jim Kirby, 1958
 Chicago Cubs, NL, 1940
 Hal Kolstad, 1959
 Boston Red Sox, AL, 1962-1963
 Jerry Mallett, 1958, 1959, 1960
 Boston Red Sox, AL, 1959
 Al Moran, 1958, 1959, 1960
 New York Mets, NL, 1963-1964
 Jim Pagliaroni, 1958
 Boston Red Sox, AL, 1960-1962
 Pittsburgh Pirates, NL, 1963-1967
 Oakland Athletics, AL, 1967
 Seattle Pilots, AL, 1969
 Bill Pleis, 1958
 Minnesota Twins, 1961-1966
 Jay Ritchie, 1958, 1959
 Boston Red Sox, AL, 1964-1965
 Atlanta Braves, NL, 1966-1967
 Cincinnati Reds, NL, 1968
 Ted Schreiber, 1959, 1960
 New York Mets, NL, 1963
 Tracy Stallard, 1959, 1960
 Boston Red Sox, AL, 1960-1962
 New York Mets, NL, 1963-1964
 St. Louis Cardinals, NL, 1965-1966
 Bob Tillman, 1959
 Boston Red Sox, AL, 1962-1967
 New York Yankees, AL, 1967
 Atlanta Braves, NL, 1968-1970

See also

 Sports in Allentown, Pennsylvania
 History of baseball in Allentown, Pennsylvania

Notes

References

 Minor league park was a major hit, Allentown Morning Call, March 30, 2008
  baseball-reference.com (All team and player statistics and teams)
  Red Sox Double-A Affiliate History (Eastern League became AA in 1963)

1958 establishments in Pennsylvania
1960 disestablishments in Pennsylvania
Baseball in Allentown, Pennsylvania
Baseball teams disestablished in 1960
Baseball teams established in 1958
Boston Red Sox minor league affiliates
Eastern League (1938–present) teams
Defunct baseball teams in Pennsylvania
Defunct Eastern League (1938–present) teams